Veilchen (Violet) was a wolfpack of German U-boats that operated during the World War II Battle of the Atlantic from 20 October 1942 to 7 November 1942.

Service
The group was responsible for sinking eight merchant ships  and damaging a further two merchant ships .

Raiding History

U-boats

Bibliography

References
Notes

Wolfpacks of 1942